Georgi Sashkov Bratoev (born 21 October 1987) is a Bulgarian volleyball player, a member of Bulgaria men's national volleyball team, and a bronze medalist of the 2009 European Championship.

Personal life
He has a twin brother Valentin Bratoev, who is also a volleyball player (outside hitter).

Career
In 2016 he signed a one-year contract with Polish club Espadon Szczecin.

Sporting achievements

Clubs

CEV Champions League
  2015/2016 - with Trentino Diatec

National team
 2009  CEV European Championship

Individual
 2012 FIVB Volleyball World League - Best Setter
 2012 Olympic Games London - Best Setter

References

External links
 
 
 
 

1987 births
Living people
Bulgarian men's volleyball players
Bulgarian expatriates in Russia
Expatriate volleyball players in Russia
Olympic volleyball players of Bulgaria
Volleyball players at the 2012 Summer Olympics
Bulgarian expatriates in Italy
Expatriate volleyball players in Italy
Volleyball players at the 2015 European Games
European Games medalists in volleyball
European Games silver medalists for Bulgaria
Bulgarian expatriate sportspeople in Poland
Expatriate volleyball players in Poland
Sportspeople from Sofia
Bulgarian twins
Expatriate volleyball players in Qatar
Trentino Volley players
VC Lokomotyv Kharkiv players
Bulgarian expatriates in Qatar